Lyncon Correa Gonçalves (born 7 May 2005) is a Brazilian footballer who plays as a defender for Vasco da Gama.

Early life
At nine months old, Lyncon had a near-fatal accident, suffering third degree burns requiring two months of hospitalisation and multiple surgeries. After seeing a psychologist at the age of five, he was encouraged to begin playing sports to take his mind off the accident.

Club career
Lyncon began his footballing career at the Escolinha do Edinho, before joining professional side Vasco da Gama at the age of ten. Two years later, due to the travel difficulties from his hometown, Itaboraí, he moved in with teammate Paulinho. He signed his first professional contract with the club in September 2021.

He made his professional debut with Vasco da Gama on 14 January 2023, coming on as a substitute for Eric Pimentel in a 0–0 Campeonato Carioca draw with Madureira. During the game, he took the ball from his own half, dribbling past three defenders and taking the ball into the box, before his shot was saved by goalkeeper Gerson Dida. The run was compared to Diego Maradona's goal against England at the 1986 FIFA World Cup.

Career statistics

Club

References

2005 births
Living people
Sportspeople from Rio de Janeiro (state)
Brazilian footballers
Association football defenders
CR Vasco da Gama players
People from Itaboraí